The Piano is the original soundtrack, on the Virgin Records label, of the 1993 Academy Award-winning film The Piano. The original score was composed by Michael Nyman and is his twentieth album release. Despite being called a "soundtrack", this is a partial score re-recording, as Nyman himself also performs the piano on the album (whereas the film version is performed by lead actress Holly Hunter). The music is performed by the Munich Philharmonic Orchestra conducted by Nyman with Michael Nyman Band members John Harle, David Roach and Andrew Findon performing the prominent saxophone work.

The album was nominated for the Golden Globe Award for Best Original Score (but lost to the score of Heaven & Earth) and the BAFTA Award for Best Score (lost to the score of Schindler's List).

The album design and illustration are by Dave McKean.

Nyman said the most famous theme "The Heart Asks Pleasure First" is based on a popular Scottish song titled "Gloomy Winter's Noo Awa", which is set to the traditional tune "Lord Balgownie’s Favourite". The closing edit is similar to the Scottish song used in Beethoven's Sunset.

Track listing

Note: Track 20 (The Heart Asks Pleasure First/The Promise) was not included on the American release until the remastered version in 2004, but included on the British version in the initial release.

The music has been re-recorded numerous times by different artists, and became the basis of Nyman's 1994 composition, The Piano Concerto which debuted in 1994. Perhaps the most unusual rerecording is by conductor Bill Broughton and the Orchestra of the Americas—an orchestral version sans piano. "Here to There", a saxophone solo, has become something of a staple for contemporary classical saxophonists.

Two additional solo piano pieces, "The Attraction of the Pedalling Ankle", which is based on Frédéric Chopin's Mazurka Op. 7/i, and "Deep Sleep Playing" are featured in the film, the former in scenes 51, 57, and 88, and the latter in scene 100. While not on the album, they are included in the published sheet music.

Several of the pieces from the soundtrack were used in Alexander McQueen's Fall/Winter 2006 fashion show.

The Finnish symphonic metal band Nightwish made a cover of "The Heart Asks Pleasure First" for their album Dark Passion Play that includes lyrics written by Nightwish composer and keyboardist, Tuomas Holopainen, but the band did not receive permission to release it on time for the album's release. However, the song was still played live via playback as the outro to the final concert of the Dark Passion Play World Tour held in Helsinki, Finland on 19 September 2009. On 15 December 2009, Jarmo Lautamäki, a Nightwish crew member, confirmed on his Facebook page that Nyman finally gave permission to release the cover. It was released on 2 March 2012 as a B-side on the single The Crow, the Owl and the Dove.

In December 2010 Italian rock noir band Belladonna release "Let There Be Light", a single written in collaboration with Michael Nyman and based on "The Heart Asks Pleasure First". Michael Nyman himself plays piano on the track.

Japanese figure skater Kaori Sakamoto used music from The Piano (soundtrack) in her free program for the 2018/19 season. With the program, she placed first in the 2018 Japan Figure Skating Championships.

Personnel

Music composed, arranged, conducted and produced by Michael Nyman

Music published by Michael Nyman Ltd./Chester Music Ltd.

Members of the Munich Philharmonic Orchestra

with

John Harle, soprano, alto saxophone
David Roach, soprano, alto saxophone
Andrew Findon, tenor, baritone saxophone, flute, alto flute
Michael Nyman, piano
Conducted by Michael Nyman
Produced by Michael Nyman
Engineer: Michael J. Dutton
Executive Engineer:  Malcolm Luker
Assistant Engineer:  Jamie Luker
Recorded at Arco Studios, Munich
Mixed and edited at Kitsch Studios, Brussels
Post-production at Abbey Road
Design and illustration by Dave McKean
Photography by Grant Matthews and Polly Walker
Artist representative for Michael Nyman:  Nigel Barr

Charts

Weekly charts

Year-end charts

Certifications

References

External links
 "Lord Balgownie’s Favourite", the traditional Scottish tune that is the basis of "The Heart Asks Pleasure First", played on violin by Paul Anderson

Drama film soundtracks
1993 soundtrack albums
Virgin Records soundtracks
Michael Nyman soundtracks
Albums with cover art by Dave McKean